Lee Ki-chan (Hangul: 이기찬; born January 10, 1979) is a South Korean singer and actor. He debuted as a singer in 1996, and began acting in 2006. He has appeared in several Korean dramas, as well as the American TV series Sense8.

Biography
Lee Ki-Chan made his debut as a singer when he was a high school student. In 1996, Lee took part in a talent contest held during a radio show and won the grand prize. Since then, Lee developed his career as a professional singer. At the time of Lee's debut, the Korean pop music world was dominated by dance music, but Lee Ki-Chan received attention for his soft ballads. Having undergone musical training by Han Yong-Jin, a renowned re-mix DJ, Lee Ki-Chan released his first album entitled "Na Na Na Na Nineteen." In three months after its release, 220 thousand copies were sold. The song "Please" was the most popular among its tracks. In November of the same year, Lee released his second album entitled "Indelible Impression." In his third album, Lee Ki-Chan took it upon himself to produce his own songs. As a result, the album reflected Lee's own personality and characteristics. One of Lee's most successful songs came later in his fifth album, released in 2001. This song, "Another Love Goes Away," was written by Park Jin-Young.

Lee continued to produce hit songs on his next two albums. The song "Cold" (sixth album) spent many weeks on top of the chart, and the song "Repeatedly" (seventh album) was considered one of his very best songs. However, Lee Ki-Chan suffered a financial setback on his eighth album in 2004, when he tried to venture into more high-tempo songs. He selected the dance song "I'm Nothing Without You" as the title song and did not see much success. After that, Lee spent three years on hiatus. He decided to go back to ballads as in his ninth album, "Para Ti." The title song "A Beauty" was again a hit.

He attended the Seoul Arts College and Kyunghee University.

Discography

Studio albums

Compilation albums
Best (2001)

Soundtrack appearances
 2012: "Shout" – MBC Arang and the Magistrate OST part 9
 2012: "아픈 희망" (Sick of Hope) – KBS Dream High 2 OST part 5
 2012: "아니기를" – MBC Moon Embracing the Sun OST part 5
 2014: "Meet You Now" – SBS Doctor Stranger OST part 2

Filmography

Television

Film

Awards and nominations

References

External links 
 
 
 

South Korean pop singers
South Korean rhythm and blues singers
South Korean pop pianists
South Korean male singer-songwriters
South Korean male web series actors
Seoul Institute of the Arts alumni
1979 births
Living people
Male pianists
21st-century South Korean  male singers
21st-century pianists